Ribble Valley is a local government district with borough status within the non-metropolitan county of Lancashire, England. The total population of the non-metropolitan district at the 2011 Census was 57,132.  Its council is based in Clitheroe. Other places include Whalley, Longridge and Ribchester. The area is so called due to the River Ribble which flows in its final stages towards its estuary near Preston. The area is popular with tourists who enjoy the area's natural unspoilt beauty, much of which lies within the Forest of Bowland.

The district was formed on 1 April 1974 under the Local Government Act 1972, as a merger of the municipal borough of Clitheroe, Longridge urban district, Clitheroe Rural District, part of Blackburn Rural District, part of Burnley Rural District, and part of Preston Rural District, as well as the Bowland Rural District from the West Riding of Yorkshire, hence the addition of the Red Rose of Lancaster and White Rose of York on the council's coat of arms.

Governance

Elections to the borough council are held every four years, with all of the 40 seats on the council being filled at each election. After being under no overall control for a number of years, the Conservative party gained a majority at the 2003 election, when boundary changes saw the number of councillors increase by one.

Following the 2011 United Kingdom local elections and subsequent by-elections, the political composition of Ribble Valley Borough Council is as follows:

Education

State-funded schools

Primary
See

Secondary
Bowland High School, Grindleton
Clitheroe Royal Grammar School
Longridge High School
Ribblesdale High School, Clitheroe
St Augustine's RC High School, Billington
St Cecilia's RC High School, Longridge

Specialist
Hillside Specialist School, Longridge

Independent schools
Stonyhurst Saint Mary's Hall, Hurst Green (preparatory)
Moorland School, Clitheroe
Oakhill School, Whalley
Stonyhurst College, Hurst Green

Adult education
Alston Hall, Longridge

Sport
Clitheroe FC
Longridge Town FC

Local radio

Community radio
Ribble Valley Radio was a community radio station based in Clitheroe, part of the new, third sector of local radio licensed by OFCOM. The project was launched in September 2004. The radio station helped six local residents into paid work within the radio sector in just three years and trained more than 100 volunteers to present and produce their own radio shows. The project was not supported by the Borough Council, which caused controversy in the area, and local newspaper the Clitheroe Advertiser and Times' held a poll which returned the result that 94% agreed that the Ribble Valley Borough Council were wrong not to fund the project and assist its long-term success. Many letters appeared in support of the project and damning the "short sighted" decision of the council. The whole episode brought excellent publicity and boosted the radio station's listening figures by 400%.

MP Nigel Evans was a staunch supporter and tabled an Early Day Motion at Parliament EDM 979 calling for "better resources and funding" for Ribble Valley Radio and the new and emerging sector. None of this was sufficient to save the station and on 14 October 2007 Ribble Valley Radio closed, because it was unable to gain sufficient funding to apply for a licence.

A new group, known as Ribble FM, was formed in 2011 with the aim of applying for a community radio licence in the third round of licensing by Ofcom. Ribble FM was set up by The Bee founder Roy Martin and includes local directors and trustees.

Neighbouring districts

Settlements

Civil parishes

Aighton, Bailey and Chaigley
Balderstone
Bashall Eaves
Billington and Langho
Bolton-by-Bowland
Bowland Forest High
Bowland Forest Low
Bowland-with-Leagram
Chatburn
Chipping
Clayton-le-Dale
Clitheroe
Dinckley
Downham
Dutton
Easington
Gisburn
Gisburn Forest
Great Mitton
Grindleton
Horton
Hothersall
Little Mitton
Longridge
Mearley
Mellor
Middop
Newsholme
Newton
Osbaldeston
Paythorne
Pendleton
Ramsgreave
Read
Ribchester
Rimington
Sabden
Salesbury
Sawley
Simonstone
Slaidburn
Thornley-with-Wheatley
Twiston
Waddington
West Bradford
Whalley
Wilpshire
Wiswell
Worston

Economy

Although Ribble Valley is the largest area of Lancashire, it also has the smallest population. The economy of Ribble Valley is mainly rural in nature, with a high proportion of jobs being in the private sector, due to BAE there is a bigger sway towards manufacturing jobs and less of a service economy when compared to the rest of Lancashire presumably due to the size of the authority and the dispersed nature of settlements. The authority also has the highest proportion of remote workers in Lancashire.

Notable businesses
 BAE Systems and Spirit Aerosytems at Samlesbury Aerodrome

Freedom of the Borough
The following people and military units have received the Freedom of the Borough of Ribble Valley.

Military Units
 The 14th/20th King's Hussars: 24 August 1992.
 The King's Royal Hussars: 2 December 1992.
 The Duke of Lancaster's Regiment: 10 March 2011.

References

 
Non-metropolitan districts of Lancashire
Boroughs in England